Overkill is the use of excessive force or action that goes further than what is necessary to achieve its goal. It may be a literal term referring to physical damage, though it is also used in colloquial conversation as a metaphor. An example is killing an ant with a sledgehammer.

Nuclear weapons
Overkill is especially used to refer to a destructive nuclear capacity exceeding the amount needed to destroy an enemy.

The term is attested from 1946 and was in common use during the Cold War era, referring to the arms race between the United States and the Soviet Union. Both nations possess more than enough nuclear weapons to destroy one another many times over – nuclear overkill.
The term for this was "pounding the rubble" or, as military officers sometimes joked, "pounding the ruble".

In video games
Overkill is a common feature implemented in many video games, typically representing the fact that the damage a single attack inflicted on an enemy or player character far exceeded the character's remaining health points. In many first-person shooters, starting with Doom, overkilling a character results in "gibbing" – the character exploding in a shower of gore.

Notes

Slang
Violence
1940s neologisms
English words